El Tri is a Mexican rock band from Mexico City fronted by Alex Lora. It is a spinoff of Three Souls in My Mind, formed in 1968. The group is regarded as influential in the development of Mexican rock music.

Over the years, El Tri's sound has touched on several different styles including rock, psychedelic rock, hard rock, acoustic rock, blues-rock, and blues. The group has enjoyed moderate success garnering numerous gold-certified albums in Mexico.

Band history

Three Souls in My Mind

The name "Three Souls in My Mind", now commonly noted by its initials TSIMM, was initially chosen as a nod towards conventions for long band names in rock and roll. Originally composed of Alejandro Lora on bass, Memo Berea on rhythm guitar and vocals, Ernesto de Leon on lead guitar, and Carlos Hauptvogel on drums, the band has been accompanied on some albums by Arturo Labastida on saxophone and Carlos Martinez on trumpet.  Sergio Mancera also played guitar on some albums. They performed their first public engagement in October, 1968, and released 15 albums on the RAFF record label before officially changing their name and lineup in 1985.

As rock in Mexico was originally seen as 'inauthentic' when sung in Spanish, Three Souls mostly sang covers of American rock and blues songs in English.  However, at the Festival de Avándaro, often called "Mexico's Woodstock", they crossed over, singing first in English, then in Spanish.  From then on they recorded primarily in Spanish, writing most of their own songs.  When asked why they switched to Spanish, Lora replied that it was important for the audience to understand the messages of the songs.  While Three Souls had a popular following among the younger generation while singing in English, changing attitudes toward rock pushed the band to perform in the 'hoyos fonquis', where the lower classes held semi-chaotic rock shows."  Singing in his original language and for a new, energetic, young, and discontented audience, Lora's songs began reflecting more of the reality of the daily lives of average Mexicans.

El Tri
In 1985, TSIMM split into Three Souls in My Mind with Carlos Hauptvogel and El Tri with Alex Lora. Under Hauptvogel, TSIMM went to record 4 studio albums and one compilation with considerable success and El Tri from Alex Lora became the first Mexican rock band to have a Gold certified record with their album "Simplemente", which contains their first single: "Triste Canción". In 1986 their song "Vicioso del rocanrol" became a hit in Peru, topping radio charts, which opened the way to 2 concerts in Plaza de Toros Acho, where they returned one year later for a tour in 7 cities. In the same year the band was invited by Miguel Ríos to participate in the First Iberoamerican Rock Encounter at the Sports Palace of Madrid, Spain; alongside the most representative bands of countries like Chile, Venezuela, Argentina and Spain. By 1992, the band's albums were consistently going Gold in Mexico. In 1993, the band released one of their signature songs, Pobre Soñador, which became their breakout song for the SouthAmerican market, specifically, Argentina. The promotional video gained heavy rotation on the music channels.

The United States have also been an important part of their career, since they have had many presentations in New York City, Chicago, Houston, and all around the state of California, for example at Fillmore in San Francisco, and mainly in the city of Los Angeles, having presentations in places such as Los Angeles Memorial Sports Arena, The Olympic Auditorium, Pico Rivera, The Palace, The Hollywood Palladium, The Verizon Wireless Amphitheater, and more. In New York City their presentations were a success in the "Roseland", with 2 consecutive sold-outs. In 2003, they were nominated for "Best Album" at the Latin Grammy Awards, broadcast from Miami.

In 2004, Los Angeles Times writer Marla Dickerson noted that the band had "legions of loyal fans" and had "sold tens of millions of albums in Latin America", but that in spite of their success they lost their recording contract because their record label could not compete with counterfeiters.

Themes
El Tri's songs cover a wide variety of subjects. Many songs are written to reflect the personal experiences of founder Alex Lora, but frequently topics for songs are suggested by fan request. In an interview with Hispanic music website batanga.com in 2006, Alex Lora said, "the fans, they tell me, 'Hey, write the song of the Pope! Hey, write the song of Che Guevara! Write the song of truck drivers, write the song of taxi drivers, of how it would be if Mexico won the soccer World Cup, write the song of prostitutes...'" and he complies, so that their audience may "feel they wrote it themselves".

Overall, the band is known for a left-wing political viewpoint and critical perspective of Partido Revolucionario Institucional that has been featured on many of its songs and albums. In spite of their political protests, El Tri maintains a steadfast loyalty to Mexico.

Legacy
The 2008 Lonely Planet guide to Mexico calls El Tri "the grandfathers of Mexican rock." 2006's Rock en Español characterizes them as "Mexico's quintessential working-class rock outfit." They have been described in press as "Mexico's answer to the Rolling Stones": "Ancient, raunchy, but still hugely popular."

Discography

Three Souls In My Mind / El Tri 

  Abuelo / Me La He Pasado Divagando (1970)        Demo

1  Three Souls In My Mind (1970)                    Renamed Colección Avandaro 1 Versiones en Inglés 

2  Three Souls In My Mind II (1971)                 Renamed Colección Avandaro 2 Versiones en Inglés 

3  Three Souls In My Mind III (1975)                Renamed Oye Cantinero 

4  Chavo de Onda (1976)                           Renamed Adicto al Rock'n'Roll/Three Souls Boogie

5  Es lo Mejor (1977)

6  No Hay quinto Malo (1978)                        Renamed La Devaluación

7  Reclusorio Oriente (En Vivo) (1978)

8  Qué Rico Diablo (1979)                           Renamed Oye Diablo

9  El Blues del Eje Vial (1979)

10 Bellas de Noche (1980)

11 D'Mentes (1981)

12 Viejas Rolas de Rock (1982)                      Renamed Ron & Roll

13 Renovación Moral (1983)

14 Simplemente (1985)

15 Hecho en México (1986)

16 El Niño Sin Amor (1987)

17 Otra Tocada Mas (1988)

18 En Vivo!!! En la Cárcel de Santa Martha (1989)

19 21 Años Después, Alex Lora y El Tri (1989)

20 Una Leyenda Viva Llamada El Tri (1990) 

21 En Vivo!!! Y a Todo Calor (1991)

22 Indocumentado (1992)

23 25 Años (1993)

24 Una Rola Para los Minusvalidos (1994)

25 Un Cuarto de Siglo (En Vivo) (1995)

26 Hoyos en la Bolsa (1996)

27 Cuando Tú No Estás (1997)

28 Fin de Siglo (1998)

29 Sinfonico (En Vivo) (1999)

30 Lora, Su Lira y Sus Rolas (1999)

31 No Podemos Volar (2000)

32 Sinfónico II (Compilation: The Themes with Symphonic Orchestra) (2001)

33 No Te Olvides de la Banda (2002)

34 Esclavo Del Rocanrol (ODS Compilation: Themes and Interviews) (2003)

35 Alex Lora: 35 Años y lo Que le Falta Todavía (En Vivo) (2004)

36 Unplugged (En Vivo) (2004)

37 Más Allá del Bien y el Mal (2005)

38 En Directo Desde el Otro Lado (En Vivo) (2006)

39 A Talonear (2007)

40 Nada que Perder (2008)

41 De El Three A El Tri (Compilation: 2008 Versions of Tracks)

42 4 Decadas (En Vivo) (2009)

43 Libertad Incondicional]] (En Vivo 2011)

44 Ojo por ojo (2013)

45 45 Años (En Vivo) (2014)

46 Sinfónico III (En Vivo) (2015)

47 Nacimos Para Rodar (2017)

Compilation albums

15 Exitos Three Souls In My Mind (1982)
Tributo (1998)
Los Número Uno (2003)
Tributo (Banda) (2003)

References

External links
 Official site

Mexican musical groups
Mexican rock music groups
Musical groups from Mexico City
Rock en Español music groups